In sports, a slump is a period when player or team is not performing well or up to expectations. It is essentially a dry spell or drought (e.g. a losing streak), though it is often misused to define a player's decline that is natural during their career.

There are various theories behind the cause of a slump. Some attribute it simply to the reasons behind a gambler's bad luck. While a player's or team's average collective statistics over a career or season may be quite respectable, there may be peak times when performance is really spectacular, while there are also expected low points with an inevitable drought.

Others believe there are psychological issues behind a slump. At times, a player, or all the key players on a team, may feel less motivated or may not be adept to handling clutch situations.

Baseball
In baseball, a batter can be defined as "slumping" when he has gotten few or no hits over a period, and his batting average during that time is far below that of his expectations. Even stars frequently experience hitting slumps.

Cricket
In cricket, a batsman can be said to be "out of form" when he is in a slump.

See also
Sophomore slump

References

Terminology used in multiple sports
Baseball terminology